Jaipur BRTS is a bus rapid transit system, proposed to solve the traffic problem in the city of Jaipur.
In recent Rajasthan State elections, INC came into power and announced to remove Jaipur BRTS Corridors because of the accidents happening due to BRTS Corridor. Instead of BRTS, the Jaipur Development Authority had planned to build a MetroNeo on the existing BRTS corridor.

Overview 

In August 2006, the Jaipur Bus Rapid Transit Service was approved by the Indian government for implementation. The responsibility for managing Jaipur BRTS has been given to JCSTL, a Special Purpose Vehicle formed by Jaipur Development Authority and Jaipur Nagar Nigam in a joint venture. The BRTS is expected to cater to city's growing traffic for next 15–20 years. In Phase I, two corridors have been proposed.
 Sikar Road to Tonk Road – North-South Corridor
 Ajmer Road to Delhi Road – East-West Corridor

A section of North-South Corridor from C-Zone Bypass near Harmada to Pani Pech became operational in July 2010.
The work on other section of North-South Corridor and East-West Corridor has commenced.

References 

Transport in Jaipur
Transport in Jaipur
Year of establishment missing